Bel is a village in northern Aleppo Governorate, northwestern Syria. Nearby localities include Sawran  to the southeast and Kafr Ghan  to the north.

Demographics
In the 2004 census, Bel had a population of 563. In late 19th century, traveler Martin Hartmann noted Bel as a Turkish village of 15 houses, then located in the Ottoman nahiyah of Azaz-i Turkman.

References

Villages_in_Aleppo_Governorate
Populated_places_in_Azaz_District
Aleppo_geography_stubs
Turkmen communities in Syria